Joshua Jordan Stanley (born February 9, 1996), known professionally as Josh Stanley, is an English/German singer-songwriter & television personality. He was born and raised in the Principality of Monaco where he learned to sing and play the guitar and piano. After his studies at Berklee College of Music, he moved to the Netherlands to intern and work at Wisseloord Studios, where he furthered his knowledge and love for creating music. He premiered and released his first song "Young Demoiselle" on Gerard Ekdom's breakfast show on June 29th 2018. The Music Video stars himself and former French Reality TV star Kellyn Sun going around his home country of Monaco in a Vintage Austin Healey.

After the minor success of his debut single 'Young Demoiselle'!, he signed his works "Rich Boy" & "She Buys Her Men" with BMG/Wisseloord Publishing in the Netherlands.

Following his multiples releases gathering millions of streams each, the song "Swish" charted in the TOP 50 in Luxembourg on Spotify.

His TV career started in 2021 as a finalist on season 1 of the French TV Show "Mission princes et princesses: qui décrochera la couronne" a spin off of the hit reality dating show "Les Princes et Princesses de L'amour" produced by W9.

Later in 2021, he joined season 5 of the reality show "Les Princes et Princesses de L'amour" on which he wrote and performed his song "Princess Haneia". The song gained millions of views across social media platforms TikTok, Instagram, and streaming services.

In August 2022, he was announced as a cast member on Season 1 of the reality TV dating show Are You the One? UK.

Early life
Stanley attended the International School of Monaco from where he graduated with an International Baccalaureate. Growing up, he taught himself to sing and took guitar lessons. In 2012 he won the Concour Idée jeune, a competition held by the Monegasque government to help young entrepreneurs fund their projects. He won with an English/Monegasque song he wrote called "The Good Life".

Stanley's first live show came at the age of 15 for the 50th anniversary of Riviera Radio. He opened for Eddie Jordan's band "Eddie Jordan and the robbers" where he performed his song "Radio" in front of Albert II, Prince of Monaco and Princess Charlene at Jimmyz, a nightclub in Monaco.

Stanley had also pursued dancing, and was an active member of the Palladienne de Monaco, a folklorique dance group that represents Monaco at world & local events.

Discography

Singles

Television

References

External links 
 Official presence on YouTube

Male singer-songwriters
Television personalities
Monegasque musicians

Living people

1996 births